The Employment and Training Administration (ETA) is part of the U.S. Department of Labor. Its mission is to provide training, employment, labor market information, and income maintenance services. ETA administers federal government job training and worker dislocation programs, federal grants to states for public employment service programs, and unemployment insurance benefits. These services are primarily provided through state and local workforce development systems. 

President Joe Biden nominated labor lawyer and Florida politician José Javier Rodríguez for the position of Assistant Secretary for Employment and Training, the agency's leader, on June 2, 2021; he has yet to be confirmed by the Senate.

Programs administered 
 Career Advancement Accounts
 Community-Based Job Training Grants
 Disaster Unemployment Assistance
 Federal Bonding Program
 Foreign Labor Certification
 High Growth Job Training Grants
 Indian and Native American Job Training Program
 Job Corps
 Migrant and Seasonal Farmworker Job Training Program
 National Emergency Grants
 One-Stop Career Centers
Occupational Information Network (Holland Codes)
 Registered Apprenticeship
 Senior Community Service Employment Program (SCSEP)
 Trade Adjustment Assistance
 Unemployment Insurance
 Wagner-Peyser Act Programs
 Work Opportunity Tax Credit
 Workforce Innovation in Regional Economic Development (WIRED)
 Workforce Innovation and Opportunity Act Adult Job Training Programs
 Workforce Innovation and Opportunity Act Dislocated Worker Programs
 Workforce Innovation and Opportunity Act Youth Job Training Programs
 YouthBuild

History 
The agency was at first called the Manpower Administration when it was founded in 1954. It was given its present name in 1975.

The most recent confirmed Assistant Secretary is John Pallasch, who was sworn in on July 29th 2019.  He resigned on January 20, 2021. Suzan Levine was named as Principal Deputy Assistant Secretary by the incoming Biden administration on January 28, 2021, and currently serves as the Acting Assistant Secretary.

See also 
Title 20 of the Code of Federal Regulations
Job Corps
United States Employment Service

References

External links 
 
 State Unemployment Insurance and Employment Service Operations account on USAspending.gov
 Training and Employment Service account on USAspending.gov
 Job Corps account on USAspending.gov

United States Department of Labor agencies
Public employment service
Vocational education
Federal assistance in the United States